Naturally occurring praseodymium (59Pr) is composed of one stable isotope, 141Pr. Thirty-eight radioisotopes have been characterized with the most stable being 143Pr, with a half-life of 13.57 days and 142Pr, with a half-life of 19.12 hours. All of the remaining radioactive isotopes have half-lives that are less than 5.985 hours and the majority of these have half-lives that are less than 33 seconds. This element also has 15 meta states with the most stable being 138mPr (t1/2 2.12 hours), 142mPr (t1/2 14.6 minutes) and 134mPr (t1/2 11 minutes).

The isotopes of praseodymium range in atomic weight from 120.955 u (121Pr) to 158.955 u (159Pr). The primary decay mode before the stable isotope, 141Pr, is electron capture and the mode after is beta decay. The primary decay products before 141Pr are element 58 (cerium) isotopes and the primary products after are element 60 (neodymium) isotopes.

List of isotopes 

|-
| rowspan=3|121Pr
| rowspan=3 style="text-align:right" | 59
| rowspan=3 style="text-align:right" | 62
| rowspan=3|120.95536(75)#
| rowspan=3|600(300) ms
| p
| 120Ce
| rowspan=3|(3/2−)
| rowspan=3|
| rowspan=3|
|-
| β+ (rare)
| 121Ce
|-
| β+, p (rare)
| 120La
|-
| 122Pr
| style="text-align:right" | 59
| style="text-align:right" | 63
| 121.95181(54)#
| 500# ms
| β+
| 122Ce
|
|
|
|-
| 123Pr
| style="text-align:right" | 59
| style="text-align:right" | 64
| 122.94596(64)#
| 800# ms
| β+
| 123Ce
| 3/2+#
|
|
|-
| rowspan=2|124Pr
| rowspan=2 style="text-align:right" | 59
| rowspan=2 style="text-align:right" | 65
| rowspan=2|123.94296(64)#
| rowspan=2|1.2(2) s
| β+
| 124Ce
| rowspan=2|
| rowspan=2|
| rowspan=2|
|-
| β+, p (rare)
| 123La
|-
| rowspan=2|125Pr
| rowspan=2 style="text-align:right" | 59
| rowspan=2 style="text-align:right" | 66
| rowspan=2|124.93783(43)#
| rowspan=2|3.3(7) s
| β+
| 125Ce
| rowspan=2|3/2+#
| rowspan=2|
| rowspan=2|
|-
| β+, p (rare)
| 124La
|-
| rowspan=2|126Pr
| rowspan=2 style="text-align:right" | 59
| rowspan=2 style="text-align:right" | 67
| rowspan=2|125.93531(21)#
| rowspan=2|3.12(18) s
| β+
| 126Ce
| rowspan=2|(4, 5, 6)
| rowspan=2|
| rowspan=2|
|-
| β+, p (rare)
| 125La
|-
| 127Pr
| style="text-align:right" | 59
| style="text-align:right" | 68
| 126.93083(21)#
| 4.2(3) s
| β+
| 127Ce
| 3/2+#
|
|
|-
| style="text-indent:1em" | 127mPr
| colspan="3" style="text-indent:2em" | 600(200)# keV
| 50# ms
|
|
| 11/2−
|
|
|-
| rowspan=2|128Pr
| rowspan=2 style="text-align:right" | 59
| rowspan=2 style="text-align:right" | 69
| rowspan=2|127.92879(3)
| rowspan=2|2.84(9) s
| β+
| 128Ce
| rowspan=2|(3+)
| rowspan=2|
| rowspan=2|
|-
| β+, p (rare)
| 127La
|-
| 129Pr
| style="text-align:right" | 59
| style="text-align:right" | 70
| 128.92510(3)
| 32(3) s
| β+
| 129Ce
| (11/2−)
|
|
|-
| style="text-indent:1em" | 129mPr
| colspan="3" style="text-indent:2em" | 382.7(5) keV
| 1# ms
| β+
| 129Ce
| (11/2−)
|
|
|-
| 130Pr
| style="text-align:right" | 59
| style="text-align:right" | 71
| 129.92359(7)
| 40.0(4) s
| β+
| 130Ce
| (6, 7)(+#)
|
|
|-
| style="text-indent:1em" | 130mPr
| colspan="3" style="text-indent:2em" | 100(100)# keV
| 10# s
|
|
| 2+#
|
|
|-
| 131Pr
| style="text-align:right" | 59
| style="text-align:right" | 72
| 130.92026(6)
| 1.50(3) min
| β+
| 131Ce
| (3/2+)
|
|
|-
| rowspan=2 style="text-indent:1em" | 131mPr
| rowspan=2 colspan="3" style="text-indent:2em" | 152.4(2) keV
| rowspan=2|5.7(2) s
| IT (96.4%)
| 131Pr
| rowspan=2|(11/2−)
| rowspan=2|
| rowspan=2|
|-
| β+ (3.59%)
| 131Ce
|-
| 132Pr
| style="text-align:right" | 59
| style="text-align:right" | 73
| 131.91926(6)
| 1.49(11) min
| β+
| 132Ce
| (2+)
|
|
|-
| style="text-indent:1em" | 132mPr
| colspan="3" style="text-indent:2em" | 0(100)# keV
| 20# s
| β+
| 132Ce
| (5+)
|
|
|-
| 133Pr
| style="text-align:right" | 59
| style="text-align:right" | 74
| 132.916331(13)
| 6.5(3) min
| β+
| 133Ce
| (3/2+)
|
|
|-
| style="text-indent:1em" | 133mPr
| colspan="3" style="text-indent:2em" | 192.05(14) keV
| 1.1(2) μs
|
|
| (11/2−)
|
|
|-
| 134Pr
| style="text-align:right" | 59
| style="text-align:right" | 75
| 133.91571(4)
| 17(2) min
| β+
| 134Ce
| (5−)
|
|
|-
| style="text-indent:1em" | 134mPr
| colspan="3" style="text-indent:2em" | 0(100)# keV
| ~11 min
| β+
| 134Ce
| 2−
|
|
|-
| 135Pr
| style="text-align:right" | 59
| style="text-align:right" | 76
| 134.913112(13)
| 24(2) min
| β+
| 135Ce
| 3/2(+)
|
|
|-
| style="text-indent:1em" | 135mPr
| colspan="3" style="text-indent:2em" | 358.06(6) keV
| 105(10) μs
|
|
| (11/2−)
|
|
|-
| 136Pr
| style="text-align:right" | 59
| style="text-align:right" | 77
| 135.912692(13)
| 13.1(1) min
| β+
| 136Ce
| 2+
|
|
|-
| 137Pr
| style="text-align:right" | 59
| style="text-align:right" | 78
| 136.910705(13)
| 1.28(3) h
| β+
| 137Ce
| 5/2+
|
|
|-
| style="text-indent:1em" | 137mPr
| colspan="3" style="text-indent:2em" | 561.22(23) keV
| 2.66(7) μs
|
|
| 11/2−
|
|
|-
| 138Pr
| style="text-align:right" | 59
| style="text-align:right" | 79
| 137.910755(15)
| 1.45(5) min
| β+
| 138Ce
| 1+
|
|
|-
| style="text-indent:1em" | 138mPr
| colspan="3" style="text-indent:2em" | 348(23) keV
| 2.12(4) h
| β+
| 138Ce
| 7−
|
|
|-
| 139Pr
| style="text-align:right" | 59
| style="text-align:right" | 80
| 138.908938(8)
| 4.41(4) h
| β+
| 139Ce
| 5/2+
|
|
|-
| 140Pr
| style="text-align:right" | 59
| style="text-align:right" | 81
| 139.909076(7)
| 3.39(1) min
| β+
| 140Ce
| 1+
|
|
|-
| style="text-indent:1em" | 140m1Pr
| colspan="3" style="text-indent:2em" | 127.5(3) keV
| 0.35(2) μs
|
|
| 5+
|
|
|-
| style="text-indent:1em" | 140m2Pr
| colspan="3" style="text-indent:2em" | 763.3(7) keV
| 3.05(20) μs
|
|
| (8)−
|
|
|-
| 141Pr
| style="text-align:right" | 59
| style="text-align:right" | 82
| 140.9076528(26)
| colspan=3 align=center|Stable
| 5/2+
| 1.0000
|
|-
| rowspan=2|142Pr
| rowspan=2 style="text-align:right" | 59
| rowspan=2 style="text-align:right" | 83
| rowspan=2|141.9100448(26)
| rowspan=2|19.12(4) h
| β− (99.98%)
| 142Nd
| rowspan=2|2−
| rowspan=2|
| rowspan=2|
|-
| EC (.0164%)
| 142Ce
|-
| style="text-indent:1em" | 142mPr
| colspan="3" style="text-indent:2em" | 3.694(3) keV
| 14.6(5) min
| IT
| 142Pr
| 5−
|
|
|-
| 143Pr
| style="text-align:right" | 59
| style="text-align:right" | 84
| 142.9108169(28)
| 13.57(2) d
| β−
| 143Nd
| 7/2+
|
|
|-
| 144Pr
| style="text-align:right" | 59
| style="text-align:right" | 85
| 143.913305(4)
| 17.28(5) min
| β−
| 144Nd
| 0−
|
|
|-
| rowspan=2 style="text-indent:1em" | 144mPr
| rowspan=2 colspan="3" style="text-indent:2em" | 59.03(3) keV
| rowspan=2|7.2(3) min
| IT (99.93%)
| 144Pr
| rowspan=2|3−
| rowspan=2|
| rowspan=2|
|-
| β− (.07%)
| 144Nd
|-
| 145Pr
| style="text-align:right" | 59
| style="text-align:right" | 86
| 144.914512(8)
| 5.984(10) h
| β−
| 145Nd
| 7/2+
|
|
|-
| 146Pr
| style="text-align:right" | 59
| style="text-align:right" | 87
| 145.91764(7)
| 24.15(18) min
| β−
| 146Nd
| (2)−
|
|
|-
| 147Pr
| style="text-align:right" | 59
| style="text-align:right" | 88
| 146.918996(25)
| 13.4(4) min
| β−
| 147Nd
| (3/2+)
|
|
|-
| 148Pr
| style="text-align:right" | 59
| style="text-align:right" | 89
| 147.922135(28)
| 2.29(2) min
| β−
| 148Nd
| 1−
|
|
|-
| style="text-indent:1em" | 148mPr
| colspan="3" style="text-indent:2em" | 50(30)# keV
| 2.01(7) min
| β−
| 148Nd
| (4)
|
|
|-
| 149Pr
| style="text-align:right" | 59
| style="text-align:right" | 90
| 148.92372(9)
| 2.26(7) min
| β−
| 149Nd
| (5/2+)
|
|
|-
| 150Pr
| style="text-align:right" | 59
| style="text-align:right" | 91
| 149.926673(28)
| 6.19(16) s
| β−
| 150Nd
| (1)−
|
|
|-
| 151Pr
| style="text-align:right" | 59
| style="text-align:right" | 92
| 150.928319(25)
| 18.90(7) s
| β−
| 151Nd
| (3/2)(−#)
|
|
|-
| 152Pr
| style="text-align:right" | 59
| style="text-align:right" | 93
| 151.93150(13)
| 3.63(12) s
| β−
| 152Nd
| 4+
|
|
|-
| 153Pr
| style="text-align:right" | 59
| style="text-align:right" | 94
| 152.93384(11)
| 4.28(11) s
| β−
| 153Nd
| 5/2−#
|
|
|-
| 154Pr
| style="text-align:right" | 59
| style="text-align:right" | 95
| 153.93752(16)
| 2.3(1) s
| β−
| 154Nd
| (3+, 2+)
|
|
|-
| 155Pr
| style="text-align:right" | 59
| style="text-align:right" | 96
| 154.94012(32)#
| 1# s [>300 ns]
| β−
| 155Nd
| 5/2−#
|
|
|-
| 156Pr
| style="text-align:right" | 59
| style="text-align:right" | 97
| 155.94427(43)#
| 500# ms [>300 ns]
| β−
| 156Nd
|
|
|
|-
| 157Pr
| style="text-align:right" | 59
| style="text-align:right" | 98
| 156.94743(43)#
| 300# ms
| β−
| 157Nd
| 5/2−#
|
|
|-
| 158Pr
| style="text-align:right" | 59
| style="text-align:right" | 99
| 157.95198(64)#
| 200# ms
| β−
| 158Nd
|
|
|
|-
| 159Pr
| style="text-align:right" | 59
| style="text-align:right" | 100
| 158.95550(75)#
| 100# ms
| β−
| 159Nd
| 5/2−#
|
|

References 

 Isotope masses from:

 Isotopic compositions and standard atomic masses from:

 Half-life, spin, and isomer data selected from the following sources.

 
Praseodymium
Praseodymium